The 2016 Junior Pan Pacific Swimming Championships were held from 24 to 27 August 2016 at Lahaina Aquatic Center in Maui, Hawaii, United States. Competition was conducted in a long course (50 metre) pool with finals contested in an A-final and B-final format with medalists determined from the A-final. This continued the nomenclature used for the 2014 edition.

Results

Men

Women

Medal table

Championships records set
The following Championships records were set during the course of competition.

References

External links
 Results

Swimming competitions in the United States
2016 in swimming
August 2016 sports events in the United States
2016 in sports in Hawaii